Corbie is a commune of the Somme department in Hauts-de-France in northern France.

Geography
The small town is situated  up river from Amiens, in the département of Somme and is the main town of the canton of Corbie. It lies in the valley of the river Somme, at the confluence with the Ancre. The town is bisected by the Canal de la Somme.

This satellite photograph shows it in its context. The town is to the left and the fenny Somme valley winds down to it from the right. The chalk of the Upper Cretaceous plateau shows pale in the fields. The river Ancre flows down from the north-east. The A29 road is shown under construction snaking across the chalk in the southern part of the picture. The fainter, straight line just to its north is the road N29. It passes through Villers-Bretonneux, the village just south of Corbie.

History

Corbie Abbey

The town of Corbie grew up round Corbie Abbey, founded in 657 or 660 by the queen regent Bathilde, with a founding community of monks from Luxeuil Abbey in the Franche-Comté.

Its scriptorium came to be one of the centers of work of manuscript illumination when the art was still fairly new in western Europe. In this early Merovingian period the work of Corbie was innovative in that it portrayed images of people, such as Saint Jerome. It was also the place of creation, in about 780, of the influential Caroline minuscule script.

The contents of its library are known from catalogues of the eleventh and twelfth centuries. In 1638, Cardinal Richelieu ordered the transfer of the library's books to the library at Saint-Germain-des-Prés, which was dispersed at the end of the eighteenth century.

Town
In 1234, Floris IV, Count of Holland died at a tournament held here. In 1475, the town was taken by Louis XI. The Spanish took it after a short siege on 15 August 1636 but were ousted in November by Richelieu and Louis XIII of France after a siege of three months.

In 1918, Corbie was on the margin of the battlefield of Villers-Bretonneux at which the First Battle of the Somme (1918) of the German spring offensive came to a climax.

Population

Pictures

Sights
Abbey of St. Peter (Saint Pierre)
Town Hall
Church of la Neuville; at the north-west end of the town

Personalities
Adalard of Corbie, a German cousin of Charlemagne, was abbot of Corbie. In 822, he founded Corvey Abbey (Corbeia nova or "new Corbie") on the territory of Höxter in Westphalia.
Adela of France, Countess of Flanders (1009–1079), countess of Corbie, married Baldwin V, Count of Flanders(c. 1030-1070); their son, Baldwin of Mons became Baldwin VI, Count of Flanders.
Saint Gérard (born at Corbie in 1025): abbot and confessor.
Saint Colette (born at Corbie in 1381): reformer of the Franciscan Order
Eugène Lefebvre, aviation pioneer, born at Corbie 4 October 1878. He was the first pilot to be killed at the controls of his aeroplane, 7 September 1909

Twin towns
 Höxter, Germany
 Pickering, Great Britain

See also
Communes of the Somme department

References

External links

 Corbie town site
 Catholic Encyclopedia (Corbie)

Communes of Somme (department)
Picardy